José Andrés Corral Arredondo (November 30, 1946 – December 24, 2011) was the Roman Catholic bishop of the Roman Catholic Diocese of Parral, Mexico.

Ordained to the priesthood in 1970, he became bishop in 1989.

Notes

21st-century Roman Catholic bishops in Mexico
1946 births
2011 deaths
20th-century Roman Catholic bishops in Mexico